Estonian Semiotics Association is an Estonian voluntary association, which connects semioticians in Estonia.

The association publishes the publication Acta Semiotica Estica.

The association is the member of International Association for Semiotic Studies (IASS). The association is also the associated member for Estonian Academy of Sciences.

References

External links
 

Scientific organizations based in Estonia
Semiotics organizations